Marry the Girl (released in Europe as The House of Deceit) is a 1928 American silent drama film directed by Phil Rosen. The 56-minute film was written by Wyndham Gittens and Frances Guihan, shot by cinematographer Herbert Kirkpatrick and was produced by Sterling Pictures.

Cast
Barbara Bedford as Elinor
Robert Ellis as Harry Wayland
DeWitt Jennings as Martin Wayland
Freddie Burke Frederick as Sonny
Florence Turner as Miss Lawson
Paul Weigel as The Butler
Alan Roscoe as Cliff Lawson

References

External links
 
 

1928 drama films
1928 films
Silent American drama films
American silent feature films
American black-and-white films
Films directed by Phil Rosen
1920s American films